Paul Christopher Gillis (born December 31, 1963) is a Canadian former professional ice hockey forward. He played in the National Hockey League with the Quebec Nordiques, Chicago Blackhawks and Hartford Whalers between 1982 and 1993.

Playing career
Born in Toronto, Ontario, Gillis is the brother of Mike Gillis. As a youth, he played in the 1976 Quebec International Pee-Wee Hockey Tournament with a minor ice hockey team from Toronto.

Gillis started his National Hockey League career with the Quebec Nordiques in 1983. He also played for the Chicago Blackhawks and Hartford Whalers. He left the NHL after the 1993 season.

Coaching career
Gillis began his coaching career with the Springfield Falcons of the American Hockey League (AHL) in 1994–95, followed by two years as head coach of the Windsor Spitfires of the Ontario Hockey League (OHL). Gillis then led the Quad City Mallards to a United Hockey League (UHL) championship in 1997–98 with a remarkable 55-18-1 regular-season record. After a brief stint back in the OHL, Gillis returned to the UHL as head coach of the New Haven Knights for two years, and then returned to Quad City where he guided the Mallards to the UHL finals again in 2002–03. He moved on to the Danbury Trashers and in 2005–06 made his third trip to the UHL finals, before coaching the Elmira Jackals for the final 28 games of the 2006–07 season.

In the spring of 2007, Gillis was named as the third head coach in the Odessa Jackalopes' 12-year history, and his impact was immediate. Gillis led the Jackalopes back to the CHL postseason after the team missed out entirely in the 2006–07 campaign.

In 14 years as a coach, Gillis finished with a winning record 10 times.

Career statistics

Regular season and playoffs

References

External links
 

1963 births
Living people
Canadian ice hockey centres
Canadian ice hockey coaches
Chicago Blackhawks players
ECHL coaches
Fredericton Express players
Hartford Whalers players
Indianapolis Ice players
Niagara Falls Flyers players
North Bay Centennials players
Quebec Nordiques draft picks
Quebec Nordiques players
Ice hockey people from Toronto